Chuck Yeager's Advanced Flight Trainer is an aircraft simulation computer game published by Electronic Arts in 1987. It was originally released as Chuck Yeager's Advanced Flight Simulator. Due to a legal dispute with Microsoft over the term "Flight Simulator", the game was pulled from shelves and renamed. Many copies of the original version were sold prior to this. Chuck Yeager served as technical consultant for the game, where his likeness and voice were prominently used.

The game allows a player to "test pilot" 14 different airplanes, including the Bell X-1, which Yeager had piloted to become the first man to exceed Mach 1.

The game is embellished by Yeager's laconic commentary: When the user crashes one plane, Yeager remarks "You really screwed the pooch on that one", or other asides.

Aircraft
Chuck Yeager's Advanced Flight Trainer includes 11 real aircraft and three experimental aircraft designed by the developers. The fictional experimental aircraft were named after people who worked on the game.
Real aircraft
Bell X-1
Cessna 172
Douglas X-3 Stiletto
General Dynamics F-16 Fighting Falcon
Lockheed SR-71 Blackbird
McDonnell Douglas F/A-18 Hornet
North American P-51 Mustang
Piper PA-28 Cherokee
Sopwith Camel
SPAD S.XIII
Supermarine Spitfire
Experimental aircraft
Grace Industries XPG-12 Samurai
Hilleman Ltd. XRH4 MadDog
Lerner Aeronautics XNL-16 Instigator

Reception
The game was a big hit for EA, selling 100,000 copies by December 1987. In May 1988, it was awarded a "Platinum" certification from the Software Publishers Association for sales above 250,000 units. Game reviewers Hartley and Patricia Lesser complimented the game in their "The Role of Computers" column in Dragon #126 (1987), giving PC/MS-DOS version of the game 4 out of 5 stars. The Lessers reviewed the Macintosh version of the game in 1988 in Dragon #140 in "The Role of Computers" column, giving that version 4 stars as well. Compute! criticized the blocky graphics and sound, but noted that the simple graphics resulted in a high frame rate. It concluded that Chuck Yeager differed from other games in simulating flying high-performance experimental aircraft. Computer Gaming World reviewed the game and stated that Yeager has been a top gun performer for the San Mateo based software company, also noting that the game went SPA "Gold" quickest of any Electronic Arts title (in a little over three months of sales).

In a 1994 survey of wargames Computer Gaming World gave the title one-plus stars out of five.

Legacy
This game was followed in 1989 by Chuck Yeager's Advanced Flight Trainer 2.0 and in 1991 by Chuck Yeager's Air Combat.

References

External links

1987 video games
Amstrad CPC games
Apple II games
Advanced Flight Trainer
Commodore 64 games
DOS games
Flight simulation video games
Classic Mac OS games
MSX games
Single-player video games
Tandy 1000 games
Video games developed in the United States
ZX Spectrum games